Folk Session Inside is an album by the bluegrass band Country Gentlemen, recorded in 1963. This album proved to be the last for bassist Tom Gray.

Track listing
 The Bluebirds Are Singing For Me (Mac Wiseman) 2:14
 Sad And Lonesome Day (Traditional) 2:37
 The Girl Behind The Bar (Stanley) 3:05
 Can't You Hear Me Callin' (Bill Monroe) 2:26
 The School House Fire (Traditional) 4:00
 Nightwalk (Eddie Adcock) 2:40
 The Galveston Flood (Traditional) 3:08
 The Young Fisherwoman 4:34
 This Morning At Nine (Sid Campbell) 2:27
 I Am Weary (Let Me Rest) (Pete Kuykendall) 2:35
 Aunt Dinah's Quilting Party (Traditional) 2:52
 Heartaches (Al Hoffman, John Klenner) 3:03
 Dark As A Dungeon (Merle Travis) 4:21

Personnel
 Charlie Waller - guitar, vocals
 John Duffey - mandolin, vocals
 Eddie Adcock - banjo, vocals
 Tom Gray - bass, vocals

References

External links
 

1963 albums
The Country Gentlemen albums